The European Short Track Speed Skating Championships are a European short track speed skating event and held once a year in a different country.

Medal winners

Men's 

1 Thibaut Fauconnet of France was originally ranked first overall but was disqualified for failing drug tests.
2 Thibaut Fauconnet was originally ranked third overall but was disqualified for failing drug tests.

Women's

Medal count

Overall classification

See also
Short track speed skating

References

External links
International Skating Union

 
Short track speed skating competitions
European championships